Tom Scott (born 6 April 1904 – 24 December 1979) was an English footballer who played as a striker.

External links
 LFC History profile

1904 births
English footballers
Liverpool F.C. players
Footballers from Newcastle upon Tyne
Sunderland A.F.C. players
Darlington F.C. players
Bristol City F.C. players
Preston North End F.C. players
Norwich City F.C. players
Exeter City F.C. players
Hartlepool United F.C. players
Bangor City F.C. players
1979 deaths
Association football forwards